John Kenneth Stoddart (1962–2019) was an Australian professional tennis player.

Active on the professional tour in the 1980s, Stoddart had a best singles world ranking of 339. He qualified for the main draw of the 1982 Australian Open and was beaten in the second round by Pat Cash.

References

External links
 
 

1962 births
2019 deaths
Australian male tennis players